Walter Dawson may refer to:

Walt Dawson (born 1982), American Alzheimer's disease activist
Walter Dawson (RAF officer) (1902–1994), British air chief marshal